Winthemiini is a tribe of flies in the family Tachinidae.

Genera
Chesippus Reinhard, 1967
Crypsina Brauer & von Bergenstamm, 1889
Diotrephes Reinhard, 1964
Hemisturmia Townsend, 1927
Nemorilla Rondani, 1856
Orasturmia Reinhard, 1947
Rhaphiochaeta Brauer & Bergenstamm, 1889
Smidtia Robineau-Desvoidy, 1830
Winthemia Robineau-Desvoidy, 1830

References

Brachycera tribes
Muscomorph flies of Europe
Diptera of Asia
Diptera of North America
Exoristinae